This is a list of compositions by Samuel Barber sorted by genre, opus number, date of composition, and title.

References

External links
 Samuel Barber website

 
Barber, Samuel, List of compositions by